Noppadon Noppachorn  (born 24 February 1968) is a former professional snooker player from Thailand who played a number of matches on the world snooker tour between 1992 and 2002.

He played as part of the 1996 Snooker World Cup Thailand team with fellow professionals James Wattana and Tai Pichit.

3 times Noppachorn reached the final 32 of professional tournaments. At the 1997 Welsh Open Noppachorn defeated David Finbow in the round of 64 before losing to Tony Drago. He reached the last 32 of the 1999 Grand Prix. Qualifying with wins over Sean Storey, and David Gray and then defeating Jamie Burnett 5-2 before losing to second seed Stephen Hendry. Then, at the 2001 Welsh Open his run to the last 32 was ended by future world champion Peter Ebdon.

Non-ranking finals: 3 (3 titles) 
 WPBSA Minor Tour – Event 2  – 1995
 Pakistan Masters – 1996
 Thailand Masters  – 2003

References 

Noppadon Noppachorn
Living people
Asian Games medalists in cue sports
Cue sports players at the 1998 Asian Games
Cue sports players at the 2010 Asian Games
Medalists at the 1998 Asian Games
Medalists at the 2010 Asian Games
Noppadon Noppachorn
Noppadon Noppachorn
1968 births
Noppadon Noppachorn